Robin Hood's Chase is Child ballad 146 and a sequel to Child ballad 145, "Robin Hood and Queen Katherine". This song has survived as, among other forms, a late seventeenth-century English broadside ballad. It is one of several ballads about the medieval folk hero that form part of the Child Ballads, a comprehensive collection of traditional English and Scottish ballads.

Synopsis
The tale opens with a recount of the archery contest in "Robin Hood and Queen Katherine", for which Queen Katherine has wagered "three hundred Tun of good red wine / and three hundred Tun of Beer" (2.4-5). She summons Robin Hood to tell him of the match and Robin agrees to it, with the proviso that if he misses the mark, whether it be light or dark, he will be hanged.

Robin wins the match against the Queen's archers, but King Henry (possibly intended as Henry VIII of England) is angry that he has won and pursues Robin in a very long chase through many towns, including Yorkshire, Newcastle, Berwick, and many others. At first, Robin is protected by the Queen, but he must flee the court before the King returns.

The first village the King visits in pursuit of Robin Hood is Nottingham, where Robin is hiding in Sherwood Forest. But the King hears Robin and knows he is there, and so Little John suggests they flee to Yorkshire; from there, Robin Hood and his men pass through the fore-mentioned towns and others besides. Finally, Robin decides they should go to London; perhaps the King is chasing them because the Queen wishes to see Robin.

When he meets the Queen in London, he tells her he is there to see the King and the Queen tells him of the King's pursuit to Sherwood. Robin tells her he will then go back to Sherwood to speak to Henry. The King returns after Robin has left the court, and when he hears that Robin has been there he says "Dame fortune" has been "unkind" and calls Robin a "cunning knave" (21.5, 23.4). Hearing this, the Queen begs Henry to pardon Robin Hood's life and so the chase comes to an end.

See also
List of the Child Ballads

Notes

References

Bibliography

External links

 Link to a facsimile sheet of an early modern version of this ballad at the English Broadside Ballad Archive at the University of California, Santa Barbara: 
 Link to an audio recording of this ballad: 
 Link to the website of The Robin Hood Project, a collection of webpages chronicling the development of Robin Hood from his medieval origins to modern depictions, at the Robbins Library at the University of Rochester: 
 Link to a fairly comprehensive website on all things Robin Hood, including historical background on the real Robin Hood and other characters of the legend, texts and recordings of Robin Hood stories, resources for teachers and students, information about adaptations, and more: 

Child Ballads
Robin Hood ballads